Olga May Jekyll  (née MacPherson, 8 October 1918 – 11 February 2014) was a New Zealand fencer, who represented her country at the 1950 British Empire Games.

Fencing
Born Olga May MacPherson on 8 October 1918, Jekyll competed in her first fencing tournament in 1938. She went on to win 18 Canterbury championships, and five New Zealand national titles: in 1950, 1951, 1952, 1953, and 1959. At the 1950 British Empire Games in Auckland, Jekyll represented New Zealand in the individual women's foil, recording three wins to finish in fifth place.

Jekyll retired from competitive fencing in 1972, but continued her involvement in the sport as an administrator and coach, including at Avonside Girls' High School. She was a founding member of the United Fencing Club in Christchurch in 1956.

Personal life
After World War II, Jekyll married Allan Joseph Jekyll, but was widowed by his death in 1948. The couple did not have children, and she never remarried.

Honours and recognition
In the 1982 Queen's Birthday Honours, Jekyll was awarded the Queen's Service Medal for community service. She was also a life member of the New Zealand Amateur Fencing Association.

Fencing Midsouth awards the Olga Jekyll Trophy annually, and organises an Olga Jekyll mixed teams event.

Later life and death
As a result of the 2011 Christchurch earthquake, Jekyll was forced to move from her home. She died in Christchurch on 11 February 2014.

References

1918 births
2014 deaths
Sportspeople from Christchurch
New Zealand female foil fencers
Commonwealth Games competitors for New Zealand
Fencers at the 1950 British Empire Games
Recipients of the Queen's Service Medal
20th-century New Zealand women